Ali Hashem is a columnist for Al-Monitor a reporter who covers the Middle East in general with special emphasis on Iranian affairs. He currently serves as a senior journalist at Al Jazeera English and prior to that he was BBC’s Iran affairs correspondent. With BBC he was the first journalist to break the news on the assassination of Qassem Soleimani on January, 3rd 2020. Ali is among the first staff that launched Al Mayadeen news channel in 2012 and BBC’s Arabic Television in 2008. With Al Mayadeen, he served as the channel’s Iran bureau chief, covering the nuclear talks during the presidency of Hasan Rouhani, the nuclear deal in Vienna where he was the only Arab journalist to interview Iran’s foreign minister Mohammad Javad Zarif during the talks and after the announcement on July 14, 2015. 
During the second decade of the 21st century, he covered the fall of Mosul and the emergence of ISIS in Iraq and produced an hour-long documentary on the group’s leader Abu Bakr Al-Baghdadi. He wrote a detailed biography of Al-Baghdadi for Al-Monitor and the Sunday Times that were referenced in several books on the subject. 
Until March 2012, he was Al Jazeera's war correspondent, covering the revolution in Libya and Syria, draught and famine in Somalia, and Iran’s general election.
He was the first journalist to interview Libyan general Khalifa Haftar on the outset of the events in Libya.
Ali has written for several international Institutes and media outlets, such as Foreign Policy, The Guardian, the Sunday Times, the Middle East Institute, the Century Foundation, Carnegie Foundation, among others. In the Arab world Ali wrote for Lebanese daily As Safir, the Egyptian dailies Al-Masry Al-Youm and Al-Dustour and the Jordanian daily Al Ghad.

Hashem resigned from the Qatari channel only one year after joining its office in Beirut in protest over "bias" reporting of the Syrian crisis, accusing the Qatari government of pushing Al Jazeera towards "media suicide".

On March 9, 2012, he announced his resignation on Twitter but didn't give reasons, but Lebanese daily Al-Akhbar published a story about the resignation.

Birth and early life
Ali Hashem was born to a family of Lebanese immigrants in the West African state of Sierra Leone. The journalist's family immigrated to Sierra Leone in the early twenties of the 20th century. Hashem has two brothers, Nour and Abdul Karim. With the civil war in Lebanon coming to an end in 1990, and the start of the rebel war in Sierra Leone, the family relocated to Lebanon where he completed his studies. 
The journalist received his Bachelor of Arts degree in journalism from the American University of Science and Technology in Beirut, and a master's degree  in politics and international relations from the Royal Holloway, University of London.
Hashem is married to Rabab Shamas, and they have three children: Malika, Hashem, and Loujain.

Journalism
On his Linkedin page, Hashem describes himself as follows "for the past 15 years, I worked in several news outlets with varying editorial guidelines, some with conflicting agendas, this  provided me with vast experience on how to practice journalism in a politicized sphere while adhering to my journalistic values."
He started his career in 2002 with Hezbollah affiliated TV station Al Manar. in 2007 he left to BBC Arabic and then in 2011 to Aljazeera. Ali resigned from AlJazeera in 2012 to join the newly established AlMayadeen. In 2017, Ali announced that he'll be leaving AlMayadeen to return to the BBC Arabic.

Al Manar
With Al Manar TV, Ali Hashem reported the 2006 war between Hezbollah and Israel. He was based in the South Lebanese city of Tyre and covered several events that took place during the war.
After the war, Hashem returned to Beirut where he was shot by a sniper in 2007 during what's known as the Arab University events, he survived, though one of the cameramen was injured.

BBC

In 2007 Ali joined BBC Arabic after a couple of months with newly launched Al Jazeera English language channel. At BBC Arabic, Hashem reported from various locations and covered several stories, later on he produced and presented a weekly flagship program named the commission.

Al Jazeera
After joining Al Jazeera in Beirut, Hashem was dispatched to Libya to cover the revolution Libya that erupted on Feb. 17, 2011. He was stationed in Benghazi where he covered the NATO strikes and the battles fought between the rebels and Gaddafi's forces.
After Libya, he returned to Lebanon, where he had to cover Lebanese politics and tension related to the Syrian uprising on the Syrian Lebanese borders.
Ali travelled to Somalis to cover Famine and drought there. In 2012 he announced his resignation from AlJazeera claiming later that the channel's agenda in Syria and Bahrain was the reason.

Al Mayadeen
At AlMaydeen Ali played a vital role in building the channel's assignment desk during the launch period, and then he went back to the field, covering stories from Syria, Egypt, Gaza, Venezuela, Iraq, and Sierra Leone.

BBC

Ali rejoined BBC Arabic in 2018 to become the channel's Iran affairs correspondent. He was the first BBC Arabic reporter to gain access to Iran since the organisation was expelled amid the 2009 uprising.

Interviews

References

1980 births
Lebanese journalists
Living people